Boxing at the 1996 Summer Olympics took place in the Alexander Memorial Coliseum in Atlanta. The boxing schedule began on 20 July and ended on 4 August. Twelve boxing events were contested, with the participation of 355 athletes from 97 countries.

There was significant controversy surrounding the judging of the fight between Floyd Mayweather of the U.S. and Serafim Todorov of Bulgaria, with Todorov being awarded the semi-final bout win which, according to many observers, was won by Mayweather.

Qualification
The following tournaments were used as qualification tournaments for boxing at the 1996 Summer Olympics.

Medal winners

Medal table

References

 
1996 Summer Olympics events
Olympics
1996
International boxing competitions hosted by the United States
Boxing matches in Atlanta